= Forest Reinhardt =

American economist

Forest L. Reinhardt is an American economist, currently the John D. Black Professor at Harvard Business School.
